Playmaker or playmakers may refer to:

In sports
Playmaker, a designation assigned to some association football midfielders and forwards
Playmaker (basketball), an alternate term for the point guard position in basketball or handball
PlayMaker Football, a 1989 video game for the Macintosh operating system
"The Playmaker", a self-assigned nickname of retired American football player Michael Irvin
"Playmaker", an overdrive neckbreaker in professional wrestling used as a finishing move by Montel Vontavious Porter

In arts and popular culture
Playmaker, a 1994 film
Playmakers, a 2003 ESPN television show
Playmaker Media, an Australian television production company
PlayMakers Repertory Company, a theater company at the University of North Carolina at Chapel Hill
Playmakers Theatre, a building at the University of North Carolina at Chapel Hill
The Playmaker, a 1987 novel
Playmaker Music, a record label
Playmaker, the alias of Yusaku Fujiki in the anime series Yu-Gi-Oh! VRAINS